Datong–Puzhou campaign (同蒲战役) was a campaign that communists fought against the nationalist during the Chinese Civil War in the post-World War II era in Shanxi, and resulted in communist victory.

Order of battle
Nationalist:
The 34th Army
Communist:
4th Column of Shanxi-Hebei-Shandong-Henan Field army

Campaign
In early July, 1946, nationalist commander-in-chief of the 2nd War Zone, Yan Xishan, ordered the nationalist 34th Army under his command to attack communists from Jiexiu (介休) to help Hu Zongnan's attacks on the communists.  The nationalists planned to annihilate their communist enemy in the regions of Hongdong and Zhao (赵) City in southern Shanxi.  However, Hu Zongnan, the nationalist commander-in-chief of the 1st War Zone was soundly defeated by the communists in the Wenxi–Xiaxian campaign by late July, 1946, and was forced to retreated to Yuncheng and Wenxi (闻喜) regions to regroup and thus could not support Yan Xishan's effort.  Communists accordingly launched their Northern Shanxi campaign to further expand their victory.

In order to reinforce nationalists in northern Shanxi, Yan Xishan had to redeploy his troops from southern Shanxi, which provided the excellent opportunity for the enemy to strike in the vast region from Lingshi (灵石) to Hongdong along the Datong-Puzhou Railway.  The communist commanders were quick to seize the opportunity, and struck on August 14, 1946, after marching from Jiang (绛) county and Quwo (曲沃) county in secret on August 9 and August 10 respectively.  The campaign progressed exactly as communists had planned and ended in their predicated victory.  In addition to annihilating more than 10,000 nationalist troops, the victorious communists also succeeded in taking counties / towns including Hongdong on August 16 (killing more than a thousand nationalist troops in the process), Zhao (赵) City on August 17 (killing more than three thousands nationalist troops in the process), Huo (霍) county on August 24, Lingshi (灵石) on August 28, and Fenxi (汾西) on August 29.  The communists ended the campaign on September 1, 1946, when they took Wealthy Family's Beach (Fu Jia Tan, 富家滩).

As a result of the defeat, over 130 km stretch of area along the southern section of Datong-Puzhou Railway had fallen into the enemy hands, resulting the linkage between Yan Xishan's 2nd War Zone and Hu Zongnan's 1st War Zone was completely severed, thus making future operations more difficult.  Five important local cities / towns were lost to the communists, where they would obtain plenty of supplies.  Nationalists were also forced to be on the defensive for sometime after Datong–Puzhou campaign, while communists took the opportunity to consolidate their gains.

See also
List of Battles of Chinese Civil War
National Revolutionary Army
History of the People's Liberation Army
Chinese Civil War

References

Zhu, Zongzhen and Wang, Chaoguang, Liberation War History, 1st Edition, Social Scientific Literary Publishing House in Beijing, 2000,  (set)
Zhang, Ping, History of the Liberation War, 1st Edition, Chinese Youth Publishing House in Beijing, 1987,  (pbk.)
Jie, Lifu, Records of the Liberation War: The Decisive Battle of Two Kinds of Fates, 1st Edition, Hebei People's Publishing House in Shijiazhuang, 1990,  (set)
Literary and Historical Research Committee of the Anhui Committee of the Chinese People's Political Consultative Conference, Liberation War, 1st Edition, Anhui People's Publishing House in Hefei, 1987, 
Li, Zuomin, Heroic Division and Iron Horse: Records of the Liberation War, 1st Edition, Chinese Communist Party History Publishing House in Beijing, 2004, 
Wang, Xingsheng, and Zhang, Jingshan, Chinese Liberation War, 1st Edition, People's Liberation Army Literature and Art Publishing House in Beijing, 2001,  (set)
Huang, Youlan, History of the Chinese People's Liberation War, 1st Edition, Archives Publishing House in Beijing, 1992, 
Liu Wusheng, From Yan'an to Beijing: A Collection of Military Records and Research Publications of Important Campaigns in the Liberation War, 1st Edition, Central Literary Publishing House in Beijing, 1993, 
Tang, Yilu and Bi, Jianzhong, History of Chinese People's Liberation Army in Chinese Liberation War, 1st Edition, Military Scientific Publishing House in Beijing, 1993 – 1997,  (Volum 1), 7800219615 (Volum 2), 7800219631 (Volum 3), 7801370937 (Volum 4), and 7801370953 (Volum 5)

Campaigns of the Chinese Civil War
1946 in China
Conflicts in 1946
Military history of Shanxi